Professor John Selwyn Bromley (1913–17 April 1985), was a prominent British Naval Historian.

Biography

Born in 1913, John Selwyn Bromley was educated at Bedford School and at New College, Oxford.  He joined the Civil Service and was Private Secretary to the Financial Secretary to the Treasury between 1941 and 1946. He was Fellow in Modern History at Keble College, Oxford, between 1947 and 1960, and Professor of Modern History at the University of Southampton, between 1960 and 1977. He published widely and is best known for Volume VI of the New Cambridge Modern History, published in 1970.

Professor John Selwyn Bromley died in Southampton on 17 April 1985, aged 71.

Publications
Corsairs and Navies, 1660–1760, 1987
The Clockmakers' Library : the catalogue of the books and manuscripts in the library of the Worshipful Company of Clockmakers, 1977
Britain and the Netherlands, Volume V, Some Political Mythologies : papers delivered to the fifth Anglo-Dutch Historical Conference [held at the University of Southampton, September, 1973], 1975
The Manning of the Royal Navy : selected public pamphlets, 1693-1873, 1974-1976
Statesmen, Scholars and Merchants : essays in eighteenth-century history presented to Dame Lucy Sutherland, 1973
New Cambridge Modern History - Volume VI - The Rise of Great Britain and Russia, 1688-1715, 1970
Metropolis, Dominion and Province : papers delivered to the Fourth Anglo-Dutch Historical Conference, 1969
Britain and the Netherlands in Europe and Asia : papers delivered to the third Anglo-Dutch Historical Conference, 1968
William III and Louis XIV : Essays 1680-1720, 1968
Britain and the Netherlands : Papers delivered to the Anglo-Dutch Historical Conference, 1962, 1964
History and the Younger Generation : an inaugural lecture delivered at the University on 28th November, 1961, 1962
The Armorial Bearings of the Guilds of London : a record of the heraldry of the surviving companies with historical notes, 1960
Britain and the Netherlands : papers delivered to the Oxford-Netherlands Historical Conference, 1959, 1960
The Man of Ten Talents : A Portrait of Richard Chenevix Trench, 1807-86; Philologist, Poet, Theologian, Archbishop, 1959
A Select List of Works on Europe and Europe Overseas, 1715-1815, 1956-1974

References

1913 births
1985 deaths
People educated at Bedford School
Alumni of New College, Oxford
Academics of the University of Southampton
Fellows of Keble College, Oxford
English book editors
20th-century British historians
English male non-fiction writers
20th-century English male writers